Brigadier General Tekle Kiflay is the current commander of Operation Zone One in Eritrea. The country has five operation zones, each headed by a high-ranking military official. These zones overlap the 6 administrative regions. The power of the Operation Zone commanders supersedes that of the administrators.

References 

Eritrean soldiers
Year of birth missing (living people)
Living people